Bob Sweeney may refer to:

Bob KO Sweeney (1894–1961), American boxer
Bob Sweeney (ice hockey) (born 1964), American professional ice hockey player
Bob Sweeney (actor and director) (1918–1992), television actor, director and producer
Dr. Bob Sweeney, a fictional character appearing in the 1998 film American History X

See also
Robert Sweeney (disambiguation)